George "Speed" Palfreyman Jr. (May 17, 1893 – November 7, 1936) was an American football and basketball coach. He was the second head football coach at Fifth District Normal School—now known as Northwest Missouri State University—in Maryville, Missouri, serving for two seasons, from 1916 to 1917, and compiling a record of 2–13. He was also the school's head basketball coach from 1915 to 1918, tallying a mark of 19–10.

After graduating from Benton High School in St. Joseph, Missouri, Palfreyman played college basketball at the University of Missouri from 1912 to 1915 and was captain of the team in 1914–15.  He taught at a high school in Maryville and was then employed by the Goodrich Tire Company as an assistant manager in Milwaukee.  He also worked for Goodrich in Chicago and Akron, Ohio. Palfreyman died at the age of 43, on November 7, 1936, at the home of his parents in Topeka, Kansas.

Head coaching record

Football

References

External links
 

1893 births
1936 deaths
American men's basketball players
Basketball coaches from Missouri
Missouri Tigers men's basketball players
Northwest Missouri State Bearcats football coaches
Northwest Missouri State Bearcats men's basketball coaches
Sportspeople from St. Joseph, Missouri
Basketball players from Missouri